Pope Agatho (577 - 10th January 681) served as the bishop of Rome from 27 June 678 until his death.  He heard the appeal of Wilfrid of York, who had been displaced from his see by the division of the archdiocese ordered by Theodore of Canterbury. During Agatho's tenure, the Sixth Ecumenical Council was convened to deal with monothelitism. He is venerated as a saint by both the Catholic and Eastern Orthodox churches.

Early life
Little is known of Agatho before his papacy but he may have been among the many Sicilian clergy in Rome at that time, due to the Caliphate's attacks on Sicily in the mid-7th century. He served several years as treasurer of the church of Rome. He succeeded Donus in the pontificate.

Papacy
Shortly after Agatho became pope, Bishop Wilfrid of York arrived in Rome to invoke the authority of the Holy See on his behalf. Wilfrid had been deposed from his see by Archbishop Theodore of Canterbury, who had carved up Wilfrid's diocese and appointed three bishops to govern the new sees. At a synod which Pope Agatho convoked in the Lateran to investigate the affair, it was decided that Wilfrid's diocese should indeed be divided, but that Wilfrid himself should name the bishops.

The major event of his pontificate was the Sixth Ecumenical Council (680–681), following the end of the Muslim Siege of Constantinople, which suppressed Monothelism, which had been tolerated by previous popes (Honorius I among them). The council began when Emperor Constantine IV, wanting to heal the schism that separated the two sides, wrote to Pope Donus suggesting a conference on the matter, but Donus was dead by the time the letter arrived. Agatho was quick to seize the olive branch offered by the Emperor. He ordered councils held throughout the West so that legates could present the universal tradition of the Western Church. Then he sent a large delegation to meet the Easterners at Constantinople.

The legates and patriarchs gathered in the imperial palace on 7 November 680. The Monothelites presented their case. Then a letter of Pope Agatho was read that explained the traditional belief of the Church that Christ was of two wills, divine and human. Patriarch George of Constantinople accepted Agatho's letter, as did most of the bishops present. The council proclaimed the existence of the two wills in Christ and condemned Monothelitism, with Pope Honorius I being included in the condemnation. When the council ended in September 681 the decrees were sent to the Pope, but Agatho had died in January. The Council had not only ended Monothelism, but also had healed the schism.

Agatho also undertook negotiations between the Holy See and Constantine IV concerning the interference of the Byzantine court in papal elections. Constantine promised Agatho to abolish or reduce the tax that the popes had to pay to the imperial treasury on their consecration.

Veneration

Anastatius says, that the number of his miracles procured him the title of Thaumaturgus. He died in 681, having held the pontificate about two and one-half years. He is venerated as a saint by both Catholics and Eastern Orthodox. His feast day in Western Christianity is on 10 January. Eastern Christians, including Eastern Orthodox and the Eastern Catholic Churches, commemorate him on 20 February.

References

6th-century births
681 deaths
Popes
Sicilian popes
Papal saints
Greek popes
Popes of the Byzantine Papacy
7th-century archbishops
7th-century Christian saints
Medieval Italian saints
7th-century popes
Clergy from Palermo
Burials at St. Peter's Basilica